Pariah may refer to:

 A member of the Paraiyar caste in the Indian state of Tamil Nadu
 Pariah state, a country whose behavior does not conform to norms
 Outcast (person)

Science and mathematics
 Pariah dog, a type of semi-feral dog
 Pariah (fish), a genus of fish
 Pariah group, the six ( J1, J3, J4, O'N, Ru, Ly) of the 26 sporadic mathematical groups that are not contained in the monster group

Music
 Pariah (album), 2005 album by the black metal band Naglfar
 Pariah, post-1987 name of the heavy metal band Satan
 "Pariah" by Black Sabbath, bonus track on the 2013 album 13
 "Pariah" by Danielle Dax, from the 1984 album Jesus Egg That Wept
 "Pariah" by dredg, title track of the 2009 album The Pariah, the Parrot, the Delusion
 "Pariah" by Lamb of God, from the 2000 album New American Gospel
 "Pariah" by Scar Symmetry, bonus track on the 2009 album Dark Matter Dimensions
 "Pariah" by Bullet For my Valentine from the 2015 album Venom
 "Pariah" by Ball Park Music from the 2016 album Every Night the Same Dream
 "Pariah" by Steven Wilson from the 2017 album To The Bone
 Pariah (band), a Texan heavy metal band in the late 1980s and early 1990s

Other media
 Pariah (1998 film), a film by Randolph Kret
 Pariah (2011 film), a film by Dee Rees
 Pariah (2015 film), a film by Rob McElhenney
 Pariah (character), DC Comics character
 Pariah (novel), a 1991 crime novel by Brian Vallée
 Pariah (play), an 1889 one-act play by August Strindberg
 Pariah (video game), a 2005 video game for PC and Xbox

See also 
 Paria (disambiguation)